Militant Workers Revolutionary Party was a political party in Costa Rica. In 1990 the party contested the general elections. However, its presidential candidate, Edwin Badilla, received only 1,005 (0.1%) of the votes, whilst the party received just 742 votes in the parliamentary election.

References

Defunct political parties in Costa Rica